The  is an association football tournament organised in Japan by the Kirin Brewery Company. The host, Japan, is a participant in every edition. The tournament was founded in 1978 then known as Japan Cup (International competition which national teams and clubs participated in), and was last held in its full form in 2022.

From 1992 onwards, the format was changed to a round robin national team competition. The first nation to win the competition was Argentina. Japan are the tournament's most successful team with eleven titles, followed by Peru with three titles. As of 2022, the current cup holders are Tunisia.

Since the start of the international competitions in 1992, the tournament has hosted a variety of teams from South America, Europe, Asia, and Africa. Out of the South American members of CONMEBOL who have been invited (Argentina, Chile, Colombia, Ecuador, Paraguay, Uruguay and Peru), Peru have been the most successful (three titles).

Out of the European invitees, there have been seven different champions, the most successful being the Czech Republic with two titles, with Hungary, France, Bosnia and Herzegovina, Belgium, Slovakia and Scotland winning one title each. Aside from Japan, the only other Asian country to have won the tournament are the United Arab Emirates (2005), who shared the title with Peru.

Tunisia is the only African team to win the tournament.

In addition to the annual Kirin Cup Soccer there are a few , friendlies also sponsored by the Kirin Corporation, played throughout the year in Japan. Japan took out the most recent 2021 Kirin Challenge Cup with 1–0 win over Serbia on 11 June 2021.

Tournaments
All times are Japan standard time (UTC+9)

1978 Japan Cup
Won by Borussia Mönchengladbach and Palmeiras.

1979 Japan Cup
Won by Tottenham Hotspur.

1980 Japan Cup Kirin World Soccer
Won by Middlesbrough F.C.

1981 Japan Cup Kirin World Soccer
Won by Club Brugge KV.

1982 Japan Cup Kirin World Soccer

1983 Japan Cup Kirin World Soccer

1984 Japan Cup Kirin World Soccer

Group A

Group B

1985 Kirin Cup Soccer

1986 Kirin Cup Soccer

1987 Kirin Cup Soccer

1988 Kirin Cup Soccer

1991 Kirin Cup Soccer

1992 Kirin Cup Soccer

1993 Kirin Cup Soccer

1994 Kirin Cup Soccer

1995 Kirin Cup Soccer

1996 Kirin Cup Soccer

1997 Kirin Cup Soccer

1998 Kirin Cup Soccer

1999 Kirin Cup Soccer

2000 Kirin Cup Soccer

2001 Kirin Cup Soccer

2002 Kirin Cup Soccer

2003 Kirin Cup Soccer

2004 Kirin Cup Soccer

2005 Kirin Cup Soccer

2006 Kirin Cup Soccer

2007 Kirin Cup Soccer

2008 Kirin Cup Soccer

2009 Kirin Cup Soccer

2011 Kirin Cup Soccer

2013 Kirin Challenge Cup

2014 Kirin Challenge Cup

2015 Kirin Challenge Cup

2016 Kirin Cup Soccer

Kirin Cup returned in 2016, under a new name and format: Kirin Cup Soccer 2016.

2016 Kirin Challenge Cup

2017 Kirin Challenge Cup

2018 Kirin Challenge Cup

2019 Kirin Challenge Cup

2020 Kirin Challenge Cup
On 17 July, Japan national under-23 football team was planning to hold the 2020 Kirin Challenge Cup at Noevir Stadium Kobe, but it was cancelled due to ongoing COVID-19 pandemic.

2021 Kirin Challenge Cup
The friendly against  on 3 June 2021 was cancelled due to multiple Jamaican players being unable to board their flight to Japan on account of not meeting the Japanese government's pre-travel COVID-19 testing requirements. The fixture was replaced with a match against the Japan under-24 team.

This match between Japanese teams was a substitute match for the Kirin Challenge Cup, which was a charity match, not the Kirin Challenge Cup.

2021 Kirin Challenge Cup (Under-24)
Japan, Honduras and Spain participated in the Kirin Challenge Cup (Under-24) 2021.

2022 Kirin Challenge Cup

2022 Kirin Cup Soccer 

2022 Kirin Cup Soccer was held between 10 and 14 June 2022, in a four-nation tournament format.

Teams

Semi-finals

Third place match

Final

2023 Kirin Challenge Cup

Winners (Kirin Cup Soccer)

Clubs
 1978:  Borussia Mönchengladbach and  SE Palmeiras (Shared)
 1979:  Tottenham Hotspur
 1980:  Middlesbrough
 1981:  Club Brugge
 1982:  Werder Bremen
 1983:  Newcastle United
 1984:  Internacional
 1985:  Santos
 1986:  Werder Bremen
 1987:  Fluminense
 1988:  CR Flamengo
 1989: Not Held
 1990: Not Held

National teams
 1992: 
 1993: 
 1994: 
 1995: 
 1996: 
 1997: 
 1998: 
 2001: 
 2002: Not Finished
 2003: Not Finished
 2004: 
 2006: 
 2007: 
 2008: 
 2009: 
 2010: Not Held
 2012: Not Held
 2013: 
 2014: 
 2015: 
 2016: 
 2017: Not Held
 2018: Not Held
 2019: Not Held
 2020: Not Held
 2021: Not Held
 2022:

See also

 Kirin Cup Soccer (invitational tournament)
 Kirin Challenge Cup (an international friendly match)
 Kirin Company (JFA official partner)
 Sport in Japan
 Football in Japan
 Women's football in Japan
 Japan Football Association (JFA)
 Japan national football team
 Japan women's national football team

Notes

References

External links
 
 All-time match results (1978–present) on kirin.co.jp
 Statistics on RSSSF
 Kirin Cup Soccer on Soccerway

 
Japanese football friendly trophies
International men's association football invitational tournaments
International association football competitions hosted by Japan
Japan national football team
Recurring sporting events established in 1978
1978 establishments in Japan
Annual sporting events